The Mechoopda are a tribe of Maidu people, an indigenous peoples of California. They are enrolled in the Mechoopda Indian Tribe of Chico Rancheria, a federally recognized tribe. Historically, the tribe has spoken Konkow, a language related to the Maidu language, and as of 2010, has created digital learning materials from old recordings of Emma Cooper, made during the 1940s as a part of the war effort.

The Tribe was terminated in 1967, losing its 26-acre Chico Rancheria. Today, approximately one-half of the old Chico Rancheria is now owned by California State University, Chico (CSUC). The 11-acre university-owned portion of the former reservation is used by CSUC's agriculture, anthropology, and archaeology students.

The Mechoopda regained federal recognition in 1992.

Government
The Mechoopda Indian Tribe ratified their constitution on 1 February 1998. The tribe is governed by a seven-member council. The current administration is as follows:
 Tribal Chairman: Dennis Ramirez
 Vice Chairperson: Sandra Knight: 
 Treasurer: He-Lo Ramirez 	
 Secretary: Roberta Lewis
 Member-at-Large: Barbara Rose 	
 Member-at-Large: Isaiah Meders 
 Member-at-Large: Jenny Atkins

Reservation
The Chico Ranchería is a federal reservation located in Butte County. The population on the ranchería is approximately 70. Chico is the closest town.

Notes

External links
Mechoopda Maidu Indians, official website
Mechoopda Indian Rancheria, history
University Signs Agreement with Mechoopda Tribe

Maidu
Federally recognized tribes in the United States
Native American tribes in California
Chico, California
Butte County, California